Gagea foliosa is a Mediterranean species of plants in the lily family. It is native to Spain incl. Balearic Islands, France incl. Corsica, Sardinia, Sicily, and  Algeria.

References

foliosa
Plants described in 1830